The CSK Cup is a Go competition.

Outline
The CSK Cup is sponsored by CSK. The venue for the tournament is played in Okinawa, Japan, every year. The tournament is in team format, where 4 countries pick five players to compete against 5 players from the other countries. The countries that compete are:

 Japan
 South Korea
 China
 Taiwan

The winners prize is 20 million Yen ($171,000) and is split up between team members so everyone receives 4 million Yen ($43,000). Second place prize is 10 million Yen ($86,000), third place receives 6 million Yen ($51,000) and fourth place receives 4 million Yen ($34,000).

Past winners & Runner up's

International Go competitions